Michael Douglas Lindsey (born May 4, 1970) is an American former professional baseball catcher, who played in Major League Baseball (MLB) during two seasons for the Philadelphia Phillies and Chicago White Sox. He was drafted by the Phillies in the 6th round of the 1987 Major League Baseball draft.

In 1987, Lindsey played his first professional season with the Phillies’ Class A (Short Season) Utica Blue Sox farm team, and his last season with the White Sox' Triple-A affiliates Nashville Sounds, and the Baltimore Orioles' Double-A Bowie Baysox in 1994.

References

External links

1967 births
Living people
Philadelphia Phillies players
Chicago White Sox players
Major League Baseball catchers
Baseball players from Austin, Texas
Nashville Sounds players
Utica Blue Sox players
Seminole State Raiders baseball players
Bowie Baysox players
Clearwater Phillies players
Reading Phillies players
Scranton/Wilkes-Barre Red Barons players
Spartanburg Phillies players